This is a list of bridges and tunnels on the National Register of Historic Places in the U.S. state of New Jersey.

Current listings

Former listings

References

External links

 

 
New Jersey
Bridges
Bridges